The 2000 California Democratic presidential primary election was held on Tuesday March 7, the same day as the Republican primary. Vice President Al Gore carried the primary in a landslide over former Senator Bill Bradley of New Jersey. The 2000 Democratic National Convention was held in the state, from August 14-17.

Results

See also
 2000 California Republican primary
 2000 Democratic Party presidential primaries

References

Notes

California
Democratic primary
2000